The 1978–79 Virginia Tech Hokies men's basketball team represented Virginia Polytechnic Institute and State University from Blacksburg, Virginia as members of the Metro Conference during the 1978–79 season. The Hokies were led by head coach Charles Moir and played their home games at Cassell Coliseum in Blacksburg, Virginia. After finishing fourth in the Metro regular season standings, Virginia Tech captured the conference tournament title to secure a bid to the NCAA tournament. As No. 8 seed in the Midwest region, the team beat No. 9 seed Jacksonville in the opening round before losing to eventual National runner-up Indiana State and superstar Larry Bird.

Roster

Schedule and results

|-
!colspan=9 style=| Regular Season

|-
!colspan=9 style=| Metro Tournament

|-
!colspan=9 style=| NCAA Tournament

Rankings

References

Virginia Tech Hokies men's basketball seasons
Virginia Tech
Virginia Tech
1978 in sports in Virginia
1979 in sports in Virginia